"No Molestar" ("Do Not Disturb") is a song written and recorded by Marco Antonio Solís. Released in September of 2008 for his 7th studio album No Molestar, the song performed very well in the United States entering the Billboard's on week of September 27, 2008. The song received a Latin Grammy Award for "Best Regional Mexican Song".

Track listing

Charts

References

2008 singles
Marco Antonio Solís songs
Songs written by Marco Antonio Solís
Spanish-language songs
Latin Grammy Award for Best Regional Mexican Song
Fonovisa Records singles
2008 songs